The Deniliquin Rovers Football & Netball Club, nicknamed  Rovers, is an Australian rules football and netball club playing in the Picola & District Football League.  The club is based in the Riverina town of Deniliquin, New South Wales.
In 2015, the club could not believe their luck when star forward Christopher McAllister put pen to paper and signed a life time contract to join the Deniliquin Rovers and propelled the club to preliminary finals in the reserve squad. McAllister has always praised former coach and club leading games player Liam (Bones) Fleming as being the greatest coach he has ever had.

Premierships

Picola & District Football League
4th XVII: 2014

External links
 
 Gameday website
 Deniliquin Rovers profile on Footypedia 

Picola & District Football League clubs
Deniliquin
1977 establishments in Australia
Australian rules football clubs in New South Wales